Ida Laila (November 27, 1943 – September 12, 2019) was an Indonesian singer. Laila was known for her dangdut and Malay music. She was a popular singer in the 1960s and the 1970s, and was best known for her song "Keagungan Tuhan" ("God's Majesty") which was written by Abdul Malik Buzaid.

Death 
Ida Laila died on September 12, 2019, in Madiun, at the age of 76, after a six-year battle with illness.

References

External links 
 

1943 births
2019 deaths
20th-century Indonesian women singers
Indonesian Muslims
People from Surabaya